Mount Reece is a sharp, ice-free peak in the Antarctic Peninsula, 1,085 m, standing 4 nautical miles (7 km) west of Pitt Point and 3 km southeast of Skakavitsa Peak. It is the second highest point of Kondofrey Heights forming the south wall of Victory Glacier on the south side of Trinity Peninsula. Charted in 1945 by the Falkland Islands Dependencies Survey (FIDS) and named for Alan Reece, leader of the FIDS Deception Island base in 1945, and meteorologist and geologist at the Hope Bay base in 1946. Reece, a member of the Norwegian-British-Swedish Antarctic Expedition (NBSAE), 1949–52, was killed in an airplane accident in the Canadian Arctic in 1960.

Map
 Trinity Peninsula. Scale 1:250000 topographic map No. 5697. Institut für Angewandte Geodäsie and British Antarctic Survey, 1996.

References
 SCAR Composite Antarctic Gazetteer.

Mountains of Trinity Peninsula